Ernest Douglas Baulch (24 May 1917 – 23 February 1996) was an Australian artist.

Early life
Baulch was born at Malvern, Victoria, Australia, being the only son and youngest of three children of Ernest Stanley Baulch.  He is commonly known as Douglas Baulch, the same name used on all his works. Before Douglas' first birthday his father was sent to fight in France during World War 1, only to return hospitalised for the rest of his life being completely incapacitated til his death 8 years later. This had a traumatic and emotional effect on Douglas as a young child watching and only knowing his father from his death bed. His father eventually died in 1926 when Douglas was only 9 years old.

Education
He commenced training at the Prahran Technical College (now Swinburne University) in 1931. He was strongly influenced by his tutor Tom Carter who recognised his natural talent as an exceptional impressionist with strong artistic ability . Tom introduced him to William Dargie with whom he had a long-standing friendship . Douglas took a strong interest in the true representation, depth and contrast of the Australian landscape capturing the light, hues and tones unique to Australia's environment. He further expanded the representation of the Australian society and its movement to an urbanised nation, as represented in a number of his cityscapes.

He kept to his desires and natural talent and felt he was not swayed to the then in-vogue abstraction stream. He graduated in 1934 (as a qualified teacher) but continued with post graduate studies from 1934 part-time. He became an ongoing member of the Victorian Artists Society exhibiting numerous times with them.

Career
He had 20 pieces of works on public display for over 20 years at Prahran Technical College from 1940 as a representative of excellence for the college.

To supplement his income and to support his mother and sisters he worked as a commercial artist at "Troedel and Cooper Pty Ltd" during 1936 to 1938, then til 1940 as an artist with Athol Shmith (fashion/society photographer). He then completed his post graduate studies in Fine Arts and Commercial Arts in 1940.

However he became disillusioned soon after graduating when he supplied two of his favourite pieces to a private gallery in Melbourne, which then claimed the pieces were stolen. The gallery closed and his painting were never seen again. From this day on he became more reclusive and guarded on supplying his art work to various galleries and thus exhibited significantly less than other friends such as Sidney Nolan.

With the outbreak of World War II he signed on to the Royal Australian Air Force working predominantly in northern Australia and the Pacific as a commercial artist, between 1943 and 1945 being commissioned to produce various posters and signage related to the war effort. Subsequently, doing a portrait of Sir Richard Williams

He married in 1944 to Lyla Foster, they lived at Glen Iris then Armadale. Upon returning home from the Air Force he commenced a large family with his first child Jeff born in 1946.

In 1952 he moved to East Doncaster as he enjoyed the Australian landscape and needed to find a balance between his family/financial commitments and his love for landscapes. Commonly using the Lower Templestowe and Warrandyte areas as inspiration to portray the geography and rugged bush of the area at the time. His landscape of this period displayed a natural beauty and positive view of the natural eco-environment, they were non-superficial with a multiple of views enticing the viewer to be drawn into the scene. He was good friends with Ernest Buckmaster who lived in Warrandyte at the time as they both had mutually respect for one another's work and similar views of true impressionist art versus the then open flare buoyant abstract fashion trend, this put them at odds with the then current establishment. 

By 1961 he had eight children to support (Jeff, Graeme, Madeleine, Michael, Francesca, Paul, Kevin and Lisa) and was forced to continue working as a commercial artist with various companies, while pursuing his true interest in his own time. These times were typically represented in his numerous portraits, which would capture the changing views and characteristics of the time, showing the harmonist relaxation of society. This was further enhanced by the incorporation of children representing the commencement of the baby boom and society's increased importance of children and the development of families. Thus, many of his works including landscapes will include small children in the background representing this era. He continued to exhibit with the Victoria Artists Society at this time.

In 1965 he took a sabbatical to Western Australia around the Coral Coast and Dampier, north Wickham, Roebourne, south Karratha and Barrow Island. Some of the works from this time were exhibited at the National Gallery of Western Australia.

He exhibited at Victoria Government House (for the Queens visits) in 1964. As well as multiple exhibits are locations around Melbourne, at various state Libraries, Universities, various prize shows, (e.g. Archibald) and financial institutions. His works are currently held in a number of private collections around the world in the UK, US, Belgium, Paris and Hong Kong.

Later life and death
Later in life he spend more time pursuing his own works while working as a teacher from his home (East Doncaster), on television, at various TAFEs and Monash University. As well as illustrating the book the poetry book "Beside My Hearth".

His style did change later in life with the movement to a more vivid colour expression of the natural landscape environment which was reflective of his views of life having more freedom and the heavy responsibilities of supporting a family of eight children was now lifted, as his children had matured and were pursuing their own lives.

Due to Baulch's demanding life and circumstances his total number of art works in existence is limited to several hundred individual pieces. Regretfully, having experienced his father's slow demise, Douglas too fell ill, with cancer and found himself hospitalised for a year until he died at the age of 78.

References

1917 births
1996 deaths
Artists from Melbourne
20th-century Australian painters
20th-century Australian male artists
Australian male painters
Australian commercial artists
People from Malvern, Victoria
Royal Australian Air Force personnel of World War II
Military personnel from Melbourne